Johnny Matthews (27 August 1946 – 25 December 2019) was an English footballer and manager.

Matthews started his career playing with his home club Coventry City.

He moved to Waterford United during the 1965/66 season on St. Patrick's Day under the impression from Jimmy Hill that it was for just a six-week loan period. Matthews played in the last seven games scoring twice and his loan period was extended. During the following season he signed for the club on a permanent basis. In the next 13 seasons Matthews became a legend at Kilcohan Park.

In total Matthews won 5 league medals with Waterford, was awarded a 6th many years later after not playing enough games in his first season with Waterford and another with Limerick as well as 3 runners-up medals in the FAI Cup. Matthews also played in 16 European Cup matches and scored against Celtic at Parkhead and Manchester United .

He entered management with Newcastlewest while still a player in 1986 before returning to Waterford to take the managerial reins along with Dave Kirby in 1989. His first season in charge with the Blues brought the First Division Title in 1990.

Matthews' greatest honour was winning league honours with Waterford but his cherished memory is scoring a penalty against Gordon Banks when the League of Ireland XI played the English League XI in 1971 at Lansdowne Road.

At the end of the 2012 League of Ireland season Matthews is eighth in the all-time League of Ireland goalscoring list with 156 league goals 

A noted cricketer, Matthews was a member of the Waterford Referee's Society and referees junior league matches in the Waterford Junior League maintaining his connection with soccer in the city and county.

Honours

As a player
 League of Ireland:
 Waterford: 1965–66, 1967–68, 1968–69, 1969–70, 1971–72, 1972–73
 Limerick United: 1979–80

As a manager
 League of Ireland First Division
 Waterford United 1989/90

References

July 2008 update on Johnny Matthews

1946 births
2019 deaths
League of Ireland players
Coventry City F.C. players
Waterford F.C. players
Limerick F.C. players
Galway United F.C. (1937–2011) players
Longford Town F.C. players
English footballers
League of Ireland managers
English football managers
English expatriates in Ireland
Waterford F.C. managers
League of Ireland XI players
Association football forwards